Live Concert is the title of the seventh album by singer-songwriter and producer Thomas Anders. It is his first solo album to be recorded live. 
The album was released in 1997 with a jazz band and features such evergreens as Cole Porter's Night And Day, Bobby Darin's Beyond The Sea, Barry Manilow's When October Goes and other classics.

Track listing

 "Paradise Café" (Barry Manilow, Bruce Sussman, Jack Feldman) – 4:58
 "Can't Teach My Old Heart New Tricks" (Richard A. Whiting, Johnny Mercer) – 4:06
 "Just Remember" (Manilow, Mercer) – 3:40
 "Fly Me to the Moon" (Bart Howard) – 3:29
 "When October Goes" (Manilow, Mercer) – 5:16
 "How Do You Keep the Music Playing?" (Featuring Lilly Thornton) (Michel Legrand, A. & M. Begmann) – 5:19
 "Night and Day" (Cole Porter) – 6:09
 "Beyond the Sea" (Charles Trenet, Jack Lawrence) – 5:08
 "Moonlight in Vermont" (John Blackburn, Karl Suessdorf) – 4:32

Personnel 

 Executive Producer: Thomas Anders
 Recorded live at Brasserie Faustus

Musicians 

Meinhard "Obi" Jenne - drums
Claus Koch - saxophone
Roland Doringer - bass
Volker Dorsch - piano
Lilly Thornton - backing vocals

References

Thomas Anders albums
1997 live albums